Firebreather is a comic book created by Phil Hester and Andy Kuhn and published by Image Comics. The series focuses on the life of a teenage half-dragon. The story has been told in a mini-series (2003) and a one-shot (2004). An ongoing series started in May 2008, and a movie based on the series aired on Cartoon Network on November 24, 2010.

Publication history
The character was originally part of a Young Avengers proposal that Hester put together for Marvel Comics, initially conceived to be the son of Fin Fang Foom, a concept later referenced in the Marvel Comics series Unbelievable Gwenpool.

It was reworked into a miniseries at Image Comics in 2003. A one-shot followup, The Iron Saint was published in 2004. The character returned in an ongoing series in 2008. Only two issues of the ongoing series were published, leaving the story unfinished.

Plot

Early life
Duncan Rosenblatt is the son of the human Margaret Rosenblatt and the 100 ft. dragon Belloc who rules over the monsters. This makes Duncan a hybrid of both species.

Firebreather Volume 1: (Firebreather #1-4)
Duncan begins his first day at yet another new school, trying to fit in despite his unusual physical appearance. However, there are great many obstacles to this goal, particularly his new principal and a bully named Troy. He does make a few friends amongst other outcasts. At his father Belloc's place, Duncan goes through rough training for the weekend. Belloc is training him not only to be powerful, but he wants Duncan to learn things the hard way. Duncan goes back to school where he has a principal that doesn't want him there and a jerk that won't get off his case. So for a little payback, Troy tries to set Duncan up by hiding a gun. It works, but the reaction is far more than what Troy wanted. This leads to Duncan seriously thinking about his control over his emotions and if he truly belongs in the world with humans. 

When he returns home, it is demolished and Margaret is missing. He tracks down his mother and her kidnapper, a monster from Monster Island. He and the monster have a brutal fight which ends (at least as far as Duncan is concerned) with Duncan blasting the monster with flame, leaving the monster badly burned but alive. This changes when Belloc arrives on the scene and impales the monster with his tail. Duncan figures out that Belloc arranged the kidnapping to test him and threatens to kill him if he ever endangers his mother again. After Duncan flies away, Belloc smiles to himself, saying, "That's my boy".

Firebreather: The Iron Saint
Duncan's class is taken abroad by "Mr. M" the Spanish teacher, who shows them the sights of London, before making their way to Spain. While in London, the group hears the story of "The Iron Saint", a long forgotten being that was created to fight, and survive, the King of the Monsters. The suit of armor has been passed down for generations and generations, and now it's just a museum piece. Duncan learns of its history, and its connection to him, and can't help but be curious. When he and his friend investigate, they find that the suit has been brought back to life and it's out to get Duncan. The wearer of the armor turns out to be Mr. M, who is revealed to be not only an S.O.S. escort but a survivor of an attack on a Cuban village. He attempts to use the armor to kill Duncan as revenge. However, Duncan is saved due to his half-human heritage, since the armor cannot draw human blood or else it will be destroyed, and kill humanity, and all life on Earth.

The Pact
In the first issue, Shadowhawk, Invincible, Firebreather, and Zephyr Noble, come together to fight Belloc who was going to see his son on Father's Day.

In other media
An animated CGI film adaptation based on the comics aired November 24, 2010, on Cartoon Network. The film starred the voices of Jesse Head as Duncan Rosenblatt, Dana Delany as Margaret Rosenblatt, Kevin Michael Richardson as King Belloc, Josh Keaton as Troy, Gary Anthony Williams as Principal Dave, Reed Diamond as "Blitz" Barnes, and Amy Davidson as Jenna Shwartzendruber.

Collections
 Firebreather, Vol 1 (collects v1, #1-4 and "Iron Saint" one-shot)
 Firebreather, V2: All the Best Heroes Are Orphans (collects v2, #1-4)
 Firebreather, V3: Holmgang (collects "Holmgang" 1-4) (unpublished)

References

External links
 
 Firebreather at Comic Vine
 Review of Firebreather #1, Comics Bulletin

2003 comics debuts
Image Comics characters with superhuman strength
Image Comics titles
Image Comics superheroes
Works about dragons
American comics adapted into films